Ronald K. Keys Jr. aka DJ Swamp is an American hip hop DJ, turntablist, producer and vocalist. He was born in Cleveland, Ohio, United States. He currently resides in Los Angeles, United States. In 1996, he won the title of US DMC Champion, his first year entering the tournament. Swamp toured with Beck for four years and later broke away into a solo career with his release "Never is Now" in 2001. Alternative Press gave "Never is Now" an 8/10 rating.

His follow-up, a drum 'n' bass EP, Instruments of Torture, was recorded with Jack Dangers of Meat Beat Manifesto. Vinyl Disciple produced several music videos, including four 3D music videos. The music video for "The Leaders will Follow" is the first music video to incorporate 3D video scratching. His music video for "Rock Rollin'" features Dave England of Jackass fame.

DJ Swamp has produced several DJ tools that are considered standards, including "skip-proof" records, which have the same sample repeated over and over so that if the needle is bumped it will land in the same sample.

DJ Swamp's scratch at the beginning of The Crystal Method track "Name of the Game" is one of his most recognizable scratches. The song is featured in several films, including Tropic Thunder.

DJ Swamp released a new single in 2021  "Wearin' My Mask"

1996 US DMC tournament
In 1996, as a first time entry, he won the DMC US DJ Championship. He ended his set using pitch manipulation to play Deep Purple's "Smoke on the Water", followed by him smashing his records.

Career with Beck
After winning the 1996 US DMC Championships, Swamp found himself still driving a street sweeper for a living in Ohio. He was making calls looking for gigs and a chance to break into the music scene full-time when he heard Beck was going to be in town. He formulated a plan to pose as a reporter and slip in a demo of him mixing and scratching Beck's tracks. He waited for Beck all day but never got to meet him. He did, however, give his demo tape to Beck's publicist. A few weeks later Beck called Swamp and he joined the tour as Beck's DJ. The two toured together for four years.

Career with Ministry
From 2016–2018 DJ Swamp toured as a member of the band Ministry.

Solo career
After years of touring with Beck, DJ Swamp released his first album, "Never is Now", which was supported by the successful single "Worship the Robots." The song featured Simple Text voice Fred as the rapper. The text application vocals were chopped up and manipulated to make it more like rap than just spoken text. Also on the album was "Disintegrator" which was featured in the movie "Orgazmo" and appeared on the Original Motion Picture Soundtrack.

As a solo artist DJ Swamp has opened for such artists as Daft Punk, The Prodigy, Bassnectar, Nero, The Crystal Method, Fatboy Slim, The Chemical Brothers, Mix Master Mike, Datsik, Diesel Boy, Outkast, Fuel, Method Man and Redman.

Swamp has built a loyal following around the world appearing in festivals, rock shows, hip-hop shows and even raves. His stage performance consists of him Mixing, Scratching, Magic Tricks and even Emceeing. Crowds are often overwhelmed by his stage presence, heavy bass sound, crowd interaction and give-a-ways.

DJ Swamp's scratching can be heard throughout the movie Thirteen which won an Academy Award and was the first movie for director Catherine Hardwicke of Twilight fame. He was featured in the DJ documentary Scratch and the motion picture Clockstoppers.

In 1996 DJ Swamp formed Decadent Records, which allowed him to distribute his scratch tools vinyl and digital releases. Under this label he invented several DJ tools that are considered standards, including his infamous "skip-proof scratch tool" records which have the same sample repeated over and over in a straight line so that if the needle is bumped it will land on the same sample. A technique that has been copied by most battle breaks and scratch records and are a staple in many turntablist sets.

Professional appearances
DJ Swamp has become the go to man for studio scratching in Los Angeles and has appeared on songs by Beck, The Crystal Method, Vanilla Ice, Katy Perry, Supreme Beings of Leisure, Ben Folds, Belinda, Oblivion Dust, Kid Rock, Twiztid, Blaze Ya Dead Homie, Hanson, The Bloodhound Gang, Morcheeba, The Dandy Warhols, R. L. Burnside, Faithless, OPM, Devo, Save Ferris, Say Anything, Dust Brothers, Kool Keith, Sticky Fingaz, "Weird Al" Yankovic, Death Grips and Better Than Ezra.

In 2017, the band Ministry announced him as a new member of the band.

Television appearances
ABC In Concert, The Grammy Awards, American Music Awards, Jools Holland, Jay Leno, David Letterman, Conan O'Brien, MuchMusic, Farmclub.com, MTV Awards, TFI Friday, ESPN's Summer X Games 2000, ESPN /ABC Winter X Games 2001, and Top of the Pops.

Featured in print
He has been featured in Rolling Stone, Spin, Subculture, Ray Gun, Mean, DJ Times, Keyboard, Mix, Los Angeles Times, and URB.

Discography
As a professional DJ he has been featured in songs for major artists.

Releases
 Swamp Breaks  Decadent Records 1996
 Waxcraft Decadent Records 1997
 The Skip-Proof Scratch Tool Volume 1 Decadent Records 1997
 The Neverending Breakbeats Decadent Records 1997
 The Skip-Proof Scratch Tool Volume 2 Decadent Records 1998
 The Neverending Breakbeats Volume 2 Decadent Records 1998
 The Skip-Proof Scratch Tool Volume 3 Decadent Records 2000
 The Neverending Breakbeats Volume 3 Decadent Records 2000
 The Skip-Proof Scratch Tool Volume 4 Decadent Records 2001
 Never Is Now  Lakeshore Records 2001
 Feed The Hands That Bite You/Challenger Incident  Universal Mastering Studios 2002
 Infinite House Loops Vol. 1 Decadent Records 2002
 Never Ending Drum & Bass Loops Decadent Records 2003
 The Neverending Breakbeats Volume IV  Decadent Records 2003
 Skip-Proof Scratch Tool Volume 5 Decadent Records 2005
 Never Ending Drum & Bass Loops Vol. 2 Decadent Records 2006
 Instruments of Torture Decadent Records 2006
 Scratch Tools On CD Decadent Records 2006
 Tons Of Tones Decadent Records 2007
 Sublevel Breaks Decadent Records 2008
 Vinyl Disciple (LP) Decadent Records 2011
 For Medicinal Use Only (7") Ruined Vibes 2015

Remixes
 Shoulder Holster (Maxi) Morcheeba (3 versions) Shoulder Holster (DJ S... China Records ... 1997
 You Must Learn All Nig... Fantastic Plastic Machine Emperor Norton 1999
 Mighty Mouse (7", Promo, Ltd, Tra) Mighty Mouse Remix Warner Bros. Records 1999
 For You (12") Encore For You (Swamp Remix),... 75 Ark 2000
 Because Dj Me and Dj You(DJ Swamp Remix) Tricatel 2000
 Mope (The Swamp Remix) Bloodhound Gang Geffen Records, Republic Records, Jimmy * Franks Recording Company 2000
 Feel Me 4lynn(DJ Swamp Remi... Motor Music 2001
 Work It Nelly feat.. Justin Timberlake(DJ Swamp Remix) Universal Records 2002
 Storm The Studio Meat Beat Manifesto Tino Corp. 2003
 Yellow Car Cinnamon(DJ Swamp R... Lewis Recordings 2004
 SwampDweller (CD, Dig) Circular Data (DJ Swamp Remix) Swampdweller 2007

Featured scratching on
 "Get Higher" 			Black Grape  	Get Higher Rollo And ... Radioactive 1997
 "Roving Gangster" 			Kid Rock  (CD, Album) "Devil Without A Cause" Top Dog/Lava/Atlantic 1998
 "Big Calm" 				Morcheeba   	(CD, Album) Big Calm Indochina 1998
 "Hard To Swallow" 			Vanilla Ice   (CD, Album) Universal Records 1998
 "Disintegrator" 			Dj Swamp  featured on Orgazmo (Motion Picture Soundtrack) (CD) More Nickelbag Records 1998
 "Sunday 8PM"				Faithless   (Album) ? (15 versions) Postcards, Hem Of His ... Cheeky Records ... 1998
 "Midnite Vultures"			Beck     (Album) ? (2 versions) Nicotine & Gravy, Milk... Geffen Records 1999
 "Sunday 8PM / Saturday 3AM" 	    Faithless   (Album) ? (3 versions) Postcards, Hem Of His ... Cheeky Records ... 1999
 "Menace to Sobriety"			OPM     (CD, Album) Atlantic 2000
 "Thirteen Tales From Urban Bohemia"  The Dandy Warhols  (Album) ? (2 versions) Shakin' Capitol Records 2000
 "Wish I Was In Heaven Sitting Down"  R. L. Burnside   (Album) ? (3 versions) Got Messed Up, Miss Ma... Fat Possum Records ... 2000
 "Braided Hair"			1 Giant Leap    (Single, Maxi) ? (4 versions) Palm Pictures ... 2001
 "El Capitan" 				OPM    (CD, Single) El Capitan (Soulchild ... Warner Music (Australia) 2001
 "Name Of The Game" 			The Crystal Method   (CD, Maxi, Promo) Outpost Recordings 2001
 "Tweekend" 				The Crystal Method 	(Album) ? (5 versions) Name Of The Game, Name... Outpost Recordings ... 2001
 "Community Service"			The Crystal Method 	 (2xLP) Name Of The Game (Hybr... Ultra Records 2002
 "Divine Operating System"		Supreme Beings of Leisure  (CD, Album) Ghetto, Catch Me, Get ... Palm Pictures 2002
 "Get Away" (CD, Maxi) Get Away    Supreme Beings of Leisure   (Album Version) Palm Pictures 2002
 "Resident Evil" 			The Crystal Method		– Music From And Inspired By The Original Motion Picture" (CD, Comp) Name Of The Game (Clea... Roadrunner Records 2002
 "Tweekend Album Sampler"		The Crystal Method 	 (2x12") Name Of The Game (Albu... Tiny E Music 2002
 "Emotional Technology"		BT   (Maxi, Album) ? (2 versions) Knowledge Of Self, Dar... Avex Asia Ltd. ... 2003
 "Legion Of Boom" 			The Crystal Method   (Album) ? (4 versions) The American Way V2 Records ... 2003
 "Poodle Hat" 				"Weird Al" Yankovic   (Album) ? (3 versions) Wanna B Ur Lovr Volcano (2) ... 2003
 "Black Magic"				Swollen Members  (12") Black Magic (Clean) Battle Axe Records 2006
 "Black Magic"				Swollen Members    (Album) ? (3 versions) Black Magic Battle Axe Records ... 2006
 "Afterbirth				Awol One	 (CD, Album, Dig) Speakers To The Sneakers 2.99 2007
 "Death Can Kill You" 			Awol One & Factor Only 		(12", Maxi) Side Road Records 2007
 "Reverence / Sunday 8PM" 		Faithless  (2xCD, Album, RE, Dis) Postcards, Hem Of His ... Sony BMG Music Entertainment (UK) Ltd. 2007
 "Ur So Gay" 				Katy Perry  (CD, Album) One of the Boys Capital 2007
 "11i" 				Supreme Beings of Leisure (CD, Album) Swallow Rykodisc 2008
 "The Spirit Of Apollo" 		NASA     (Album) ? (3 versions) N.A.S.A. Music Anti- 2009

Production
 Mope (Single) ? (2 versions) Mope (The Swamp Remix) Geffen Records ... 2000
 Peppermint (CD, Album) 240 Mango & Sweet Rice 2000

Appears on
 Bastard Eyes by Zilch, "Scratch Your Number (DJ Swamp Remix)" and "Sleasy Jesus (DJ Swamp, Ray McVeigh & Ryder Remix)" 1999
 Kerosene (CD, Maxi) Something To Do Slipdisc Records 1999
 Mope (CD, Maxi, Enh) Mope (The Swamp Remix) Geffen Records 2000
 1 Giant Leap (CD, Album, Plu) Braided Hair, Passion Festival Mushroom Records 2001
 Brand New History (Album) ? (3 versions)  Restless Records ... 2001
 Rockin' the Suburbs (Album) ? (4 versions) Rockin' the Suburbs Epic 2001
 The Attraction to All Things Uncertain (Album) ? (2 versions)  Six Degrees Records ... 2001
 United States Of Consciousness Six Year Anniversary (CD) Crowd Control Consciousness Records 2002
 Legion Of Boom (Album) ? (2 versions) The American Way V2 Records ... 2004
 Mr. Anonymous (CD, Album)  Not On Label 2005
 Attention Cherie (12")  Out Hear Audio 2009
 The Spirit Of Apollo (CDr, Album, Promo) N.A.S.A Music Anti- 2009
 Remixes Vol. 1 (File, MP3, 160) N.A.S.A. Music (LA Rio... Not On Label (LA Riots Self-Released)
 Project 11 Volume 1 (CD, Maxi) Spiraling (Original), ... Hot Sauce Records 2005
 Year of the Snitch  by Death Grips (Album) Third Worlds 2018

Other media appearances
 Orgazmo (Motion Picture Soundtrack) ? (2 versions) Disintegrator Nickelbag Records 1998
 Orgazmo (Original Motion Picture Soundtrack) (CD, Smplr) Disintegrator Nickelbag Records 1998
 Anarchy In the USA (CD) Disintegrator DMC Publishing 1999
 Wrong Turn (CD, Comp) He's a Killer Lakeshore Records 2003
 Instructions How To Draw Godzilla (CDr) Locked Groove Not On Label 2004
 Live @ 2939 (CDr, Mixed, Comp) Never Ending Drum & Ba... Addict Records 2004
 Baseck vs. SDR (CDr) Locked Groove Not On Label 2005
 Some Bizzare Double Album (two-CD, Comp) Worship The Robots Some Bizzare 2008

References

Living people
1974 births
American hip hop DJs
Ministry (band) members